Tom Jackson (born July 8, 1948) is a former American football player and coach.

From Scotch Plains, New Jersey, Jackson played college football from 1967 to 1970 for Penn State. Recruited as a part of Joe Paterno's first recruiting class, Jackson earned All-East honors as a guard in 1968 and 1969.  Jackson served as the head football coach at the University of Connecticut from 1983 to 1993, compiling a record of 62–57. He resigned on November 17, 1993.  Prior to taking over as head coach at Connecticut in 1983, Jackson served as the offensive line coach there.

Head coaching record

References

1948 births
Living people
American football offensive guards
UConn Huskies football coaches
Penn State Nittany Lions football players
People from Scotch Plains, New Jersey